Thomas Becker (born 6 July 1967 in Hilden) is a German slalom canoeist who competed from the late 1980s to the early 2000s (decade). Competing in two Summer Olympics, he won a bronze medal in the K1 event in Atlanta in 1996.

Becker also won six medals at the ICF Canoe Slalom World Championships with four golds (K1: 1997, K1 team: 1995, 1999, 2002), a silver (K1 team: 1991), and a bronze (K1 team: 1997).

He won the World Cup series in K1 in 1996. He also earned a total of five medals at the European Championships (3 golds and 2 silvers).

World Cup individual podiums

References

External links

1967 births
Canoeists at the 1992 Summer Olympics
Canoeists at the 1996 Summer Olympics
German male canoeists
Living people
Olympic canoeists of Germany
Olympic bronze medalists for Germany
Olympic medalists in canoeing
Medalists at the 1996 Summer Olympics
Medalists at the ICF Canoe Slalom World Championships